Joe E. Hershfield is a judge who served on the Tax Court of Canada from 2000 to 2016.

References

Living people
University of Manitoba alumni
University of Chicago alumni
Canadian Jews
Judges of the Tax Court of Canada
Lawyers in Manitoba
Year of birth missing (living people)
Place of birth missing (living people)